A British confederation or a confederal UK has been proposed as a concept of constitutional reform of the United Kingdom, in which the countries of the United Kingdom; England, Scotland, Wales, as well as Northern Ireland become separate sovereign states that pool certain key resources within a confederal system with a central authority. Under the system, the central authority exists with the consensus of the constituent countries, which also maintain a right to seccession, if they wish.

Current status of the UK 
The United Kingdom is a constitutional monarchy and a parliamentary democracy. The UK Parliament is composed of the House of Commons and the House of Lords, the UK government is led by the Prime Minister, Rishi Sunak and the head of state is King Charles III.

The UK is an asymmetrically decentralised unitary state, where Wales, Scotland and Northern Ireland have devolved governments operating under authority delegated by the UK Parliament, but supreme authority is held by the UK parliament. The "UK is a unitary state, not a federation or a confederation." according to Lord David Frost. However, it is arguable that the UK, due to being a 'union state', is more politically/nationally diverse than even some federal states.

Concept of confederation 
It has been proposed that if issues associated with an asymmetric system of governance are not solved with devolution, then the system could be reformed into a "confederation". A confederation is a loose union that has a central authority that is limited in its core powers. This central authority exists with the consensus of the constituent sovereign countries, which also maintain a right to succession.

UK confederation concept 
The concept of a confederal UK may include the following:
 The individual sovereignty of England, Northern Ireland, Scotland and Wales.
 The national parliament of each country represented in a Confederal Assembly where matters such as freedom of movement, residence, employment in neighbouring countries would be subject to negotiation.
 Joint budgetary funds raised annually and contributed by each member country as an agreed proportion of GDP. Each country operates their own tax systems and their own bank, but together may agree on a common currency.
 The confederation is defined by an agreed treaty which includes references to e.g. internal trade, currency, defence, foreign relations.
 Each decision made by the confederal assembly must be individually implemented in each country's government.
 Each country has independent legal jurisdictions and a supreme court.
It has also been suggested that the House of Lords should be replaced with a senate elected by the assemblies/parliaments of constituent countries.

The independent Constitution Commission on the Constitutional Future of Wales identified two questions on a confederal union in the case of Welsh independence:

"What evidence is there that England and/or other parts of the UK would join in any free association or confederal arrangements with Wales which would constrain their own freedom of action? 

If other parts of the UK were unwilling to enter into shared governance arrangements with an independent Wales, how would cross border matters be managed?"

UK confederation proposals 
As early as 1892, the concept of a "Britannic Confederation" has been raised which mentioned the possibility of England, Ireland, Scotland and Wales entering such a confederation as separate states.

By academics 
Gerald Holtham, Hodge Professor of Regional Economy at Cardiff Metropolitan University, also outlined his support for a confederal UK in an article for the think tank Compass.

Prof Jim Gallagher, of the Institute of Legal and Constitutional Research at the University of St Andrews, has produced a paper discussing his support for a confederate UK. Gallagher was the UK government's most senior adviser on devolution and constitutional matters. He worked on the number 10 policy unit under Gordon Brown.

In 2019, Nigel Biggar, Regius Professor of Moral and Pastoral Theology, University of Oxford, suggested it was time to form a British Isles confederation, also replacing the House of Lords with a senate elected by the assemblies/parliaments of constituent countries.

A League-Union of the Isles 
In March 2022, Glyndwr Jones of the Institute of Welsh affairs produced a document "A League-Union of the Isles" discussing constitutional options for the UK with a preface by former first minister of Wales Carwyn Jones. The author presents multiple potential constitutional options for the UK/UK nations including: devolution, federalism, confederalism, confederal-federalism, sovereignty within the EU and independence. The author settles on confederal-federalism, a union of sovereign nations that stands between federalism and a confederation, with an agreed confederal treaty between national parliaments, which jointly form a "Council of the Isles". The proposed union would include the following:

 Rights of movement, residence and employment in any nation within the union
 Each nation would have its own legal jurisdiction in addition to a "Supreme Court of the Isles"
 A common currency and a central "Bank of the Isles"
 Each nation would have its own tax regimes and contribute a proportion of their GDP to the "Council of the Isles"
 Defence, foreign policy, internal trade, currency, large scale economics and "Isles affairs" governed by the "Council of the Isles"
 Each nation holds 4 seats at the UN general council and one collective seat at the UN Security Council

By politicians 
Former Plaid Cymru leader Gwynfor Evans, advocated for a "Britannic Confederation" that included Wales, and produced a booklet including this proposal in 1988.

John Osmond, Welsh political reporter said in 2014 that the constitutional ideas proposed by former Prime Minister Gordon Brown and former First Minister of Wales Carwyn Jones were moving towards a confederation. Jones was reportedly a supporter of a confederal system and worked with Gordon Brown on his recommendations for constitutional reform of the UK. There does not seem to have been any evidence to suggest that Brown's recommendations included a confederal-type model.

Following the 2015 UK general election, then leader of Plaid Cymru, Leanne Wood adapted the party's constitutional stance back to the traditional party position of an independent Wales within a UK confederation.

In 2019, Plaid Cymru leader Adam Price also advocated for a "Britannic Confederation between Wales, Scotland and England", similarly to the Benelux union between Belgium, Netherlands and Luxembourg. Price said “I would argue that by pooling their powers within both Benelux and the European Union, the three countries have enlarged and strengthened their sovereignty. By operating closely together they have obtained greater flexibility and reach in the exercise of national power, grown their economies, and enhanced their presence on the world stage.”

In 2021, in a House of Lords Constitution Committee, "Inquiry into the Future Governance of the UK", Dr Paul Anderson suggested that further research was merited for a federal or confederal UK. He noted that this may, "contrary to the current dominant opinion among pro-Union political elites, create an even looser union". He also suggested that the SNP's campaign for independence prior to the 2014 independence referendum included "hallmarks" of a confederal UK.

In 2022, Dafydd Wigley, former Plaid Cymru MP and member of the House of Lords advocated for a "Britannic Confederation", "in which sovereignty of the three nations and the Province is acknowledged, but they pool their sovereignty for certain purposes—for example, the recognition of the Queen as the head of a Britannic confederation. Plaid Cymru and the SNP currently accept the monarchy as the Head of State, recognising a Britannic dimension to our identity as well as our own national identity." "Secondly, there might be an acceptance of sterling as the currency and a reconstituted Bank of England acting as a central bank for a confederation. Thirdly, there is scope for defence co-operation. The SNP supports an independent Scotland being part of NATO, though this is obviously complicated by the question of nuclear weapons. There is surely a pragmatic solution to enable defence co-operation.”

Northern Ireland 
Professor Brendan O'Leary of the London School of Economics has noted that an element of a confederacy already exists between the Republic of Ireland and UK's Northern Ireland. Following the Good Friday Agreement of 1998, the North/South Ministerial Council (of the island of Ireland) was established which is responsible for 12 policy areas.

See also
Constitutional reform in the United Kingdom
Federalism in the United Kingdom
Devolution in the United Kingdom
Union State
British–Irish Council
European Union
Benelux
Nordic Council

References 

Devolution in the United Kingdom
Governance in the United Kingdom
Confederations
Federalism in the United Kingdom
Proposals in the United Kingdom